Yengejah (also Romanized as Yengejah) is a village in Ujan-e Sharqi Rural District, Tekmeh Dash District, Bostanabad County, East Azerbaijan Province, Iran. At the 2006 census, its population was 96, in 28 families.

References 

Populated places in Bostanabad County